Mortensen or Mortenson (in US) is a surname of Danish and Norwegian origin, meaning son of Morten. The Swedish variant is Mårtensson. Mortensen is currently the 20th most common surname in Denmark.

It may refer to the following people:

Arne Mortensen (1900–1942), Norwegian rower
Beverly Mortensen, American musician and composer 
Carlos Mortensen (born 1972), professional poker from Ecuador 
Christian Mortensen (1882–1998), Danish-American supercentenarian
Chris Mortensen (born 1951), American journalist
Clayton Mortensen (born 1985), American baseball player
Dale L. Mortensen (1966–2020), American politician
Dale T. Mortensen (1939–2014), American economist
Dan Mortensen (born 1968), American rodeo rider
Erling Mortensen (born 1955), Danish chess master
Finn Mortensen (1922–1983), Norwegian classical composer
Flemming Møller Mortensen (born 1963), Danish politician
Greg Mortenson, American humanitarian
Hans Christian Cornelius Mortensen (1856–1921), Danish teacher and ornithologist
Jess Mortensen (1907–1962), American NCAA champion track athlete and coach
Lars Ulrik Mortensen, (born 1955), Danish harpsichordist and conductor
Malene Mortensen (born 1982), Danish singer
Ole Mortensen (born 1958), Danish cricketer
 Ole Theodor Jensen Mortensen (1868–1952), Danish professor of zoology
Stan Mortensen (1921–1991), English professional footballer 
Viggo Mortensen (born 1958), Danish-American actor, poet, musician, photographer and painter
Marilyn Monroe (born Norma Jeane Mortenson, 1926–1962), American actress
Svend Aage Mortensen (1942–2015), Danish cardiologist
William Mortensen (1897–1965), American photographer, known for 1920s–1940s Hollywood portraits in the Pictorialist style
Zachary Mortensen (born 1972), American film producer and writer

References

Danish-language surnames
Norwegian-language surnames
Patronymic surnames